Blue Memories is a song written by Karen Brooks and Paul Kennerley, and recorded by American country music artist Patty Loveless.  It was released in May 1991 as the fourth single from her album On Down the Line.

The song charted for 17 weeks on the Billboard Hot Country Singles and Tracks chart, reaching number 22 during the week of 20 July 1991.

The song was re-recorded by Loveless for her Mountain Soul II album in 2009,  with Vince Gill and Rebecca Lynn Howard as background singers  with a Bluegrass music arrangement.

Chart positions

References

1991 singles
Patty Loveless songs
Songs written by Paul Kennerley
Song recordings produced by Tony Brown (record producer)
MCA Records singles
Songs written by Karen Brooks
1990 songs